The Samuel Cox House is a historic house located near Scottville, Ashe County, North Carolina. It is a "T"-plan dwelling consisting of a two-story log, gable roof, main section built in the mid-19th century, with a later one-story frame ell and frame addition on the east side of the ell. The log section was covered with weatherboards about 1880. The front facade features a one-story, full-width shed-roof porch.

It was listed on the National Register of Historic Places on November 7, 1976.

References

Log houses in the United States
Houses on the National Register of Historic Places in North Carolina
Houses in Ashe County, North Carolina
National Register of Historic Places in Ashe County, North Carolina
Log buildings and structures on the National Register of Historic Places in North Carolina